Cavalier was one of four s built for the French Navy in the first decade of the 20th century.

Design and description
The Chasseur class was based on the preceding , albeit oil-fired boilers rather than the coal-fired ones of the earlier ships. Designed to displaced , the ships displaced  at deep load. Their crew numbered 77–79 men.

The Chasseur class was powered by three Parsons direct-drive steam turbines, each driving one propeller shaft, using steam provided by four Normand boilers. Cavalier exceeded that speed during her sea trials, reaching .

The primary armament of the Chasseur-class ships consisted of six  Modèle 1902 guns in single mounts, one each fore and aft of the superstructure and the others were distributed amidships. They were also fitted with three  torpedo tubes. One of these was in a fixed mount in the bow and the other two were on single rotating mounts amidships.

Construction and career
Cavalier was ordered from Chantiers et Ateliers Augustin Normand and was launched from its Le Havre shipyard on 9 May 1910. The ship was completed in January 1911. She survived the First World War to be condemned in December 1927.

References

Bibliography

Chasseur-class destroyers
Ships built in France
1910 ships